Adverse Childhood Experiences International Questionnaire (ACE-IQ) is a World Health Organization, 43-item screening questionnaire intended to measure types of child abuse or trauma; neglect; household dysfunction; peer violence; sexual and emotional abuse, and exposure to community and collective violence. ACE-IQ is meant to be administered to people 18 years or older in all countries, and is currently undergoing validation testing.

See also
 Adverse Childhood Experiences Study
 Early childhood trauma
 Stress in early childhood

References

Questionnaire construction
Adverse childhood experiences